Kęty  is a town in Oświęcim County, Lesser Poland Voivodeship, Poland with 18,955 inhabitants (2012).
The town located in Silesian Foothills dates its earliest document from 1277 when Polish prince of Opole Władysław confirmed sale of the settlement and adoption of Lviv city rights. The town's name comes from the word kąt (Polish for corner). The greatest development of the town came under the rule of Jagiellons, when the town became royal property.

The son of the mayor of the town of Kenty, Stanislaus Bacenga and his wife Anna became the Saint John Cantius, also known as John (Johann) of Kraków.

 Education
 
 Publiczne Przedszkole Sióstr Zmartwychwstanek im. bł. Matki Celiny Borzęckiej
 Zespół Szkolno-Gimnazjalny Nr 1 w Kętach
 Zespół Szkolno-Gimnazjalny Nr 2 w Kętach
 Zespół Szkół Podstawowo-Gimnazjalnych nr 3 w Kętach-Podlesiu im. Bohaterów Westerplatte
 Powiatowy Zespół nr 9 Szkół im. Marii Dąbrowskiej w Kętach
 Powiatowy Zespół nr 10 Szkół Mechaniczno-Elektrycznych im. M. Kopernika
 Powiatowy Zespół nr 11 Szkół Ogólnokształcących im. St. Wyspiańskiego
 Centrum Kształcenia Dorosłych w Kętach

International relations

Twin towns — Sister cities
Kęty is twinned with:
  Turzovka

References

External links
Official town webpage
 Jewish Community in Kęty on Virtual Shtetl

Cities and towns in Lesser Poland Voivodeship
Oświęcim County
Lesser Poland
Kraków Voivodeship (14th century – 1795)
Kingdom of Galicia and Lodomeria
Kraków Voivodeship (1919–1939)